Barkat Siddiqui is a veteran Pakistani television director, producer and actor. He is best known for his directing drama serial Ahsaas on PTV in 2001 and Mujhe Khuda Pe Yaqeen Hai on Hum TV in 2013 for which he earned nominations as Best Director Drama Serial and Best Drama Serial at 2nd Hum Awards.

Personal life
Barkat was born to a Muslim family in Lahore, Pakistan.

Career
Siddiqui started his career in 1980s. He has acted in two serial including Naseeb and Jeena Isi Ka Naam Hai; both work were received extravagant reception and met with positive and critical response. Later he pursued his career in directing and producing. He has a long-term relation with actor-producer Nadeem Baig with him he has collaborated in the serial Chain aye Na, Socha Na Tha and Qudrat. He has directed some very popular serial including Mujhe Khuda Pe Yaqeen Hai which earned him more acclaim.

Following is the listing of brief work by Siddiqui:

As an actor
 Naseeb
 Jeena Isi Ka Naam Hai

As a director
 Mujhey Pyar Chahiye
 Ahsaas
 Jab Jab Dil Milay
 Qudrat
 Socha Na Tha
 Chein Aaye Naa
 Mujhe Khuda Pe Yaqeen Hai
 Kaisi Hain Doorian
 Barish Kay Aansoo
 Mere Khuda
 Seep (TV series)
 Mohabbat Tujhe Alvida
 Qarar
 Bebasi

As a producer
 Jeena Isi Ka Naam Hai
 Kaisi Hain Doorian
 Mujhe Khuda Pe Yaqeen Hai
 Seep (TV series)
 Mohabbat Tujhe Alvida
 Qarar
 Bebasi

Awards and nominations

Lux Style Awards

References

External links
 Barkat Siddiqui work on Geo TV
 Barkat Siddui Biography on Video Pakistan

1971 births
Living people
People from Lahore
People from Karachi
Pakistani television producers
Pakistani television directors